Gemmula machapoorensis is an extinct species of sea snail, a marine gastropod mollusk in the family Turridae, the turrids.

Description
The length of the shell attains 19 mm.

Distribution
Fossils of this marine species have been found in Miocene strata of Panama, Trinidad and Tobago and Florida, USA.

References

 W. C. Mansfield. 1925. Miocene gastropods and scaphopods from Trinidad, British West Indies. Proceedings of the United States National Museum 66(22):9116-9125
 A. J. W. Hendy, D. P. Buick, K. V. Bulinski, C. A. Ferguson, and A. I. Miller. 2008. Unpublished census data from Atlantic coastal plain and circum-Caribbean Neogene assemblages and taxonomic opinions.

machapoorensis
Gastropods described in 1919